The House of Representatives of Antigua and Barbuda is the lower chamber of the country's bicameral parliament.

The current House of Representatives has a total of 19 members. 17 members are directly elected to five-year terms from single member constituencies using the first-past-the-post system.  There is one ex officio member (the Attorney-general) and the remaining seat is held by the Speaker.

Members of the House of Representatives

2023 to present

See also 
Senate of Antigua and Barbuda – the upper chamber of Parliament
History of Antigua and Barbuda
List of national legislatures
List of speakers of the House of Representatives of Antigua and Barbuda

References

Government of Antigua and Barbuda
Antigua and Barbuda 
Antigua and Barbuda